Tranqui is an island of the Chiloé Archipelago in southern Chile. It has three sectors: San Jose, Tranqui Nepué and Sentinel, all with small populations. A significant part of its forest still has not been touched by the subsistence agriculture which forms the bulk of the province's rural economy.

References

External links
Geography
Research at Tranqui Island Rain Forest

Islands of Chiloé Archipelago